Nicholas Hofgren is a London-based financier and fund placement advisor. He is the son-in-law of late Sir Terence Conran, the English designer, restaurateur, retailer and writer.

Early life 
Nicholas W. Hofgren was born in Washington DC on February 7, 1970. Son of Daniel W. Hofgren, former aide to President Richard M. Nixon and Alexandra Hofgren, daughter of F.G Walton Smith, the Miami oceanographer. He grew up in Washington DC and Bermuda before deciding he would like to pursue a career in finance.

Education 
He studied English/History at Emory University, Atlanta and received a degree in Hyper-Inflationary Finance from IESA in Caracas. He also completed graduate studies at the United States Department of Agriculture after graduating in 1996.

Career 
Hofgren has worked in international finance since 1989, working in North America, Latin America, Russia and the UK. He has dealt primarily in private equity partnerships, capital raising, investment and fundraising campaigns in the European Middle Eastern and African territories for various financial organisations including: JP Morgan Chase, Bank of America, Brunswick Capital Partners  and ALTA International.

He is currently co-founder of Westly House Partnership, a privately held partnership providing capital raising support to private equity and real estate firms, a company he formed with Christopher Jackson in 2008.

Nicholas was appointed CEO of Vordere PLC on November 15, 2016, a real estate management company listed on the London Stock Exchange
He is currently a board member of StableDAO, a stable coin company. StableDAO's executive chairman and CEO is Sam Lee. Sam Lee was founder of Hyperfund, a controversial DEFI company that defrauded several investors.

References

External links 
 http://westlyhouse.com
 http://www.sophieconran.com/

1970 births
Living people
American financiers
Emory University alumni